Waianae is a census-designated place (CDP) in Honolulu County, Hawaii, United States. As of the 2020 census, the CDP population was 13,614.

Its name means "waters of the mullet". Its etymology is shared with the far northern Wellington suburb of Waikanae, located in New Zealand.

Geography
Waianae is located at  (21.447714, -158.179213).

Demographics

As of the census of 2000, there were 10,506 people, 2,595 households, and 2,221 families residing in the CDP. The racial makeup of the CDP was 9.35% White, 0.81% African American, 0.26% Native American, 19.44% Asian, 27.26% Pacific Islander, 0.97% from other races, and 41.92% from two or more races. Hispanic or Latino of any race were 14.00% of the population.

There were 2,595 households, out of which 43.9% had children under the age of 18 living with them, 58.0% were married couples living together, 19.6% had a female householder with no husband present, and 14.4% were non-families. 10.9% of all households were made up of individuals, and 4.1% had someone living alone who was 65 years of age or older.  The average household size was 4.04 and the average family size was 4.30.

In the CDP the population was spread out, with 34.8% under the age of 18, 10.4% from 18 to 24, 26.8% from 25 to 44, 19.8% from 45 to 64, and 8.2% who were 65 years of age or older.  The median age was 29 years. For every 100 females there were 98.9 males.  For every 100 females age 18 and over, there were 94.5 males.

The median income for a household in the CDP was $46,717, and the median income for a family was $48,145. Males had a median income of $32,328 versus $22,451 for females. The per capita income for the CDP was $13,348.  About 17.2% of families and 19.8% of the population were below the poverty line, including 28.6% of those under age 18 and 7.9% of those age 65 or over.

Government and infrastructure

Waianae currently falls under the jurisdiction of the Hawaii House of Representatives' 44th district and the Hawaii Senate's 21st district. In the House of Representatives, Waianae is currently represented by Cedric Gates; Maile Shimabukuro currently represents Waianae in the Senate.

Education
The Hawaii Department of Education operates the public schools.

District schools inside the CDP include Leihoku Elementary School, Waianae Elementary School, and Waianae Intermediate School.

Waianae High School, which has a Waianae postal address, is physically located in two CDPs: mostly in Makaha, and partially in Waianae.

The district's Kamaile Academy is outside of the CDP. A PreK-12 charter school, Ka Waihona O Ka Naauao - New Century Pcs, is in the CDP.

Additionally Maili Elementary School has a Waianae address but is in the Maili CDP.

Leeward Community College operates Wai‘anae Moku in Maili CDP; it has a Waianae postal address.

Homeless camp
Hawaii's largest homeless camp, called Pu'uhonua o Wai'anae, is located here. It covers an area of about 20 acres adjacent to the boat harbor. Hawaii Governor David Ige met with Twinkle Borge, the leader of Pu'uhonua o Wai'anae, in March 2018, committing not to sweep the camp and displace its residents, but its future remains uncertain.

Notable people
Israel Kamakawiwoʻole, world renowned musician.
Max Holloway, UFC Featherweight Champion.
DeForest Buckner, NFL player for the Indianapolis Colts.
Jason Momoa, actor, director

References

Census-designated places in Honolulu County, Hawaii
Populated coastal places in Hawaii